The Tango Star (Spanish:El astro del tango) is a 1940 Argentine musical film directed by Luis Bayón Herrera and starring Hugo del Carril, Amanda Ledesma and Berta Aliana. A tango star enjoys a relationship with a young woman from a wealthy family.

Cast

References

Bibliography 
 Rist, Peter H. Historical Dictionary of South American Cinema. Rowman & Littlefield, 2014.

External links 

1940 films
Argentine musical films
1940 musical films
1940s Spanish-language films
Films directed by Luis Bayón Herrera
Tango films
Argentine black-and-white films
1940s Argentine films